The Cayuga Collegian is the official newspaper of Cayuga County Community College in Auburn, New York. The publication is operated by Cayuga Community College students serving as the editors, photographers and reporters. Mary Gelling Merritt, a media professional and professor, has served as the faculty advisor since 2000.

First published in October 1953 at Auburn Community College as the Auburn Collegian, the name was changed to the Cayuga Collegian when Cayuga County began to sponsor the college, which was then renamed Cayuga County Community College in 1975.

The newspaper won a first place award from the American Scholastic Press Association in the 2005-2006 National Newspaper Review. Under Josh Cradduck's tenure as executive editor and chairman, the newspaper was cited in the contest for introducing the use of color for the first time in 26 years, increasing the size of the paper from eight pages to 12 and expanding content.

The newspaper currently has over 45 awards to its name.

The Cayuga Collegian is a member of the Associated Collegiate Press.

Further reading

External links
Cayua Collegian 

Newspapers established in 1953
Student newspapers published in New York (state)
1953 establishments in New York (state)